Suixi County (postal: Suikai) is a county in the southwest of Guangdong province, China. It is under the administration of the prefecture-level city of Zhanjiang and is located at the northern end of the Leizhou Peninsula, bordering the Gulf of Tonkin to the west.

Climate

References

County-level divisions of Guangdong
Zhanjiang